TRV can refer to:
 Technical remote viewing
 Thermostatic radiator valve
 Transient recovery voltage
 The IATA airport code for Trivandrum International Airport
 Tobacco rattle virus
 New York Stock Exchange symbol for The Travelers Companies
 Trenner Verzeichnis (written “TrV”), a catalogue for the works of Richard Strauss, created by Franz Trenner
Seediq language, identified by the ISO 639 code "trv"
 Torpedo recovery vessel
TRV Tailor (803) 
TRV Trevally (802)
TRV Tuna (801)